Heshel Frumkin (1896 –11 April 1974) was an Israeli economist and politician.

Biography
Born in Babruysk in the Russian Empire (today in Belarus), Frumkin was educated in a heder and yeshiva, and was a member of Tzeiri Zion and HeHalutz during his youth. In 1920 he made aliyah to Mandatory Palestine, where he was amongst the founders of the Histadrut trade union. He became a member of kibbutz Degania Bet, and worked in road construction.

He helped establish the Office of Public Works, which later became Solel Boneh, and was one of its managers. In 1933 he became a member of the Histadrut's executive committee, and was responsible for its economics department. He also served as an economic advisor to the Histadrut leadership.

In 1949 he was elected to the first Knesset on Mapai's list. However, he resigned his seat on 5 February 1951, and was replaced by Jenia Tversky. In 1953 he established the Economics Quarterly journal, and edited it until 1974, the year in which he died.

He published two books, Economic Preparedness in 1943, and Immigration and Development on the way to the State in 1971.

References

External links
 

1896 births
1974 deaths
People from Babruysk
People from Bobruysky Uyezd
Jews from the Russian Empire
Belarusian Jews
Soviet emigrants to Mandatory Palestine
Israeli people of Belarusian-Jewish descent
Jews in Mandatory Palestine
Israeli economists
Israeli trade unionists
Mapai politicians
Members of the 1st Knesset (1949–1951)